Jerry Wayne Mumphrey (born September 9, 1952) is an American retired professional baseball outfielder. He played in Major League Baseball for the St. Louis Cardinals (1974–79), San Diego Padres (1980), New York Yankees (1981–83), Houston Astros (1983–85) and Chicago Cubs (1986–88). Mumphrey was an All-Star in 1984.

Career
Mumphrey made his major league debut with the St. Louis Cardinals. On December 7, 1979, the Cardinals traded Mumphrey and John Denny to the Cleveland Indians for Bobby Bonds. Before he could play for Cleveland, he was traded to the San Diego Padres for Jim Wilhelm and Bob Owchinko on February 15, 1980.

Before the 1981 season, the Padres traded Mumphrey and John Pacella to the New York Yankees for Ruppert Jones, Joe Lefebvre and minor league pitchers Tim Lollar and Chris Welsh. Mumphrey finished 20th in voting for the 1981 American League MVP. On August 10, 1983, the Yankees traded Mumphrey to the Houston Astros for Omar Moreno. Mumphrey was the Astros All-Star Game representative in 1984.

After the 1985 season, the Astros traded Mumphrey to the Chicago Cubs for Billy Hatcher and a player to be named later(Steve Engel).

See also
List of Major League Baseball career stolen bases leaders

References

External links

1952 births
Living people
St. Louis Cardinals players
San Diego Padres players
New York Yankees players
Houston Astros players
Chicago Cubs players
Major League Baseball center fielders
Baseball players from Texas
National League All-Stars
Gulf Coast Cardinals players
St. Petersburg Cardinals players
Cedar Rapids Cardinals players
Arkansas Travelers players
Tulsa Oilers (baseball) players
Sportspeople from Tyler, Texas